Germain Muller (July 23, 1923 in Strasbourg – October 10, 1994 in Strasbourg), was a French playwright, poet, songwriter, actor, humourist, politician and a prominent figure in Alsatian culture. In 1946, he cofounded De Barabli (The Umbrella), the most popular Alsatian language satirical cabaret. He was later elected a Strasbourg city councillor.

References

Bibliography 
 Pierre Pflimlin & Malou Schneider, Nouveau dictionnaire de biographie alsacienne, Fédération des sociétés d'histoire et d'archéologie d'Alsace, vol. 27, p. 2748

External links 

 (fr) Germain Muller et l'origine du mot Barabli (Institut national de l'audiovisuel, May 6, 1967)

1923 births
1994 deaths
Writers from Strasbourg
Politicians from Strasbourg
20th-century French dramatists and playwrights
French songwriters
Male songwriters
French male actors
French city councillors
20th-century French poets
20th-century French male actors
20th-century French musicians